Diphenylacetone may refer to:

 1,1-Diphenylacetone
 1,3-Diphenylacetone (also known as dibenzyl ketone)